List of compositions by Agostino Steffani:

Vocal works

Sacred works
Psalmodia vespertina volans
Reginam nostram formosissimam
Sacer Janus quadrifrons tribus vocibus
 Stabat mater für 6 Sänger und 7 Instrumentalisten.
Beatus Vir
Non Plus Me Ligate
Triduanas A Domino
Laudate Pueri
Sperate in Deo
Qui Diligit Mariam

Operas
 Marco Aurelio (Steffani), libretto  Ventura Terzago, Munich 1681.
 Salome (Steffani), libretto  Ventura Terzago  Munich 1681.
 Audacia e Rispetto,  Munich 1685.
 Servio Tullio, libretto  Ventura Terzago  Munich 1686.
 Erote e Anterote, libretto  Ventura Terzago  Munich 1686.
 Ascanio (Steffani), libretto  Ventura Terzago  Munich 1686.
 Alarico il Baltha, cioè l’Audace, re de’ goti, dramma per musica, Luigi Orlandi, Munich, 18 January 1687
 Niobe, regina di Tebe, dramma per musica, libretto: Luigi Orlandi, Munich, 1688
 Henrico Leone  libretto by Ortensio Mauro based on the life of the powerful German prince Henry the Lion,  first performed on 30 January 1689 in Hannover
La lotta d'Hercole con Acheloo (1689)
La superbia d'Alessandro (1690)
Orlando generoso (1691)
Le rivali concordi, or Atalanta (1692)
La libertà contenta, or Alcibiade (1693)
Baccanali (1695) for the Duke Ernest Augustus of Hannover
I trionfi, del fato, ovvero Le glorie di Enea (1695)
Briseide (1696) attrib., but probably by Pietro Torri 
Arminio (1707)- a pasticcio composed mainly of items from Steffani's earlier operas
  (1709), Tragedia per Musica,  1709, edition Gerhard Croll in  Denkmäler Rheinischer Musik
 Amor vien dal destino. Dramma Da Recitarsi Per Ordine Di Sua Altezza Elettorale Palatina In Düsseldorff LÁnno MDCCIX, Thil Schleuter, Düsseldorf 1709.

Arias from operas and serenatas recorded in recitals
A facile vittoria (from Tassilone)
Amami, e vederai (from Niobe)
Combatton quest'alma (from I trionfi del fato)
Dal tuo labbro amor m'invita (from Tassilone)
Deh stancati, o sorte (from La libertà contenta)
Foschi crepuscoli (from La libertà contenta)
Dell'alma stanca a raddolcir le tempre...Sfere amiche, or date al labbro (from Niobe)
La cerasta più terribile (from La lotta d'Hercole con Acheloo)
Mie fide schiere, all'armi!...Suoni, tuoni, il suolo scuota (from I trionfi del fato)
Morirò fra strazi e scempi (from Henrico Leone)
Ogni core può sperar (from Servio Tullio)
Ove son? Chi m'aita? In mezzo all'ombre...Dal mio petto (from Niobe)
Non prendo consiglio (from La superbia d'Alessandro)
Non si parli che di fede (from Marco Aurelio)
Notte amica al cieco Dio (from La libertà contenta)
Padre, s'è colpa in lui (from Tassilone)
Più non v'ascondo (from Tassilone)
Schiere invitte, non tardate (from Alarico il Baltha)
Serena, o mio bel sole...Mia fiamma/Mio ardore (from Niobe)
Si, si, riposa, o caro...Palpitanti sfere belle (from Alarico il Baltha)
Sposa, mancar mi sento...Deh non far colle tue lagrime (from Tassilone)
Suite aus “I trionfi del fato”
Svenati, struggiti, combatti, suda (from La libertà contenta)
T'abbraccio, mia Diva...Ti stringo, mio Nume (from Niobe)
Timori, ruine (from Le rivali concordi)
Tra le guerre e le vittorie (from La superbia d'Alessandro)

Duets and solo cantatas
Amor vien del destino  - duet
Begl'occhi, oh Dio, non più piangete - duet
Che sarà di quel pensiero - duet
Che volete o crude pene - duet
Crudo Amor morir mi sento - duet
Dimmi, dimmi Cupido - duet
Dir che giovi al mal d'amore - duet
Dolce è per voi soffrire - duet
Dolce labbro amabil bocca - duet
E così mi compatite? - duet
E perchè non m'uccidete - duet
Fileno, idolo mio - solo cantata
Fra le tenebre del duolo - duet, attrib. but by Giovanni Legrenzi
Fulminate, saettate - duet Timms C:I:17
Gelosia, che vuoi da me? - duet
Già tu parti - duet
Guardati, o core - solo cantata
Hai finito di lusigarmi - solo cantata
Ho scherzato in verità - duet
Il piu felice e sfortunato amante - solo cantata
Inquieto mio cor - duet
Io mi rido de' tuoi dardi - duet
Io voglio provar - duet
Lagrime dolorose - solo cantata
Libertà! Libertà! - duet
Lilla mia non vuoi ch'io pianga - duet
Lontananza crudel, tu mi tormenti - duet
Lungi dall'idol mio - solo cantata
M'hai da piangere un dì - duet
Mia speranza illanguidita - duet
M'ingannasti fanciullo bendato - duet
No, no, non voglio se devo amare - duet
Occhi belli, non piu - duet
Occhi, perché piangete? - duet
Placidissime catene - duet
Porto l'alma incenerita - duet
Pria ch’io faccia - duet
Quando ti stringo o cara - duet
Quanto care al cor voi siete - duet
Questo fior - duet
Ribellatevi o pensieri - duet
Rio destin che a tutte l'ore - duet
Saldi marmi che coprite - duet
Sol negl'occhi del mio bene - duet
Spezza amor, l’arco e li strali - solo cantata for soprano
Su, ferisci, alato arciero - duet Colin Timms deest
Tengo per infallibile - duet
Torna a dar vita al core - duet
Troppo cruda é la mia sorte - duet Timms C:I:70a 
Tu m'aspettasti al mare - duet
Valli secrete deh m'accogliete - duet
Vorrei dire un non so che - duet

Instrumental works
6 Sonate da Camera 
Aria for two oboes, bassoon & b.c 'Chomigiola'

References

Compositions by Agostino Steffani
Steffani